National Mortgage News is a digital media website  covering the mortgage sector in the United States. Its editor is Austin Kilgore, and its publisher is Dennis Strong. National Mortgage News is owned by SourceMedia.

History
National Mortgage Newss predecessor, National Thrift News, was founded in 1976 by Stan Strachan, Wesley Lindow, and John R. Glynn. In 1988 National Thrift News won the Polk Award in Financial Reporting for its coverage of the savings and loan crisis; in September 1987 it had been the first media outlet to break the Keating Five story. In 1989, it was the first to report on political considerations having delayed the closing of the Neil Bush-directed Silverado Savings and Loan in Denver.

Subsequently, as thrift institutions began failing, it changed its name to National Thrift and Mortgage News''', and then in 1992 to National Mortgage News. In 1995 Faulkner and Gray, which itself was part of the Thomson Corporation, acquired National Mortgage News. Stan Strachan remained publisher until his death in early 1997, at which point Tim Murphy took over as publisher of the paper.

After a reorganization in 2000, the paper became part of Thomson Media, which in turn was sold by its parent company to Investcorp and renamed SourceMedia. Observer Capital acquired the company from Investcorp in August 2014.

Dennis Strong became publisher of National Mortgage News and SourceMedia's Mortgage Group in 2015.

The paper's target audience is the 280,600-strong US mortgage sector. National Mortgage News'' has a circulation of about 8,000. About three quarters of subscribers are C-level executives.

Key employees

VP/Group Publisher
Dennis Strong

Editorial

Bonnie Sinnock, Capital Markets Editor
Tana Tymesen, Opinion Editor
Bradley Finkelstein, Originations Editor
Elina Tarkazikis, Reporter
Kate Berry, Reporter

Sales
Patrick Myers, Sales Manager, East Coast	
Kimberlee Baker, Sales Manager, West Coast

Footnotes

External links
 National Mortgage News website

Mortgage industry of the United States
Publications established in 1976
National newspapers published in the United States